Lakshmapuram is a village located in Ramannapeta Mandal, Nalgonda district, Andhra Pradesh. It had a population of 1,872 across 442 households in the 2011 Census of India.

References

Villages in Suryapet district